Anthony Lukca (born May 11, 1986) is a former professional Canadian football defensive back. He went undrafted in the 2009 CFL Draft. 

Anthony attended McGill University and graduated in Spring 2010 with a degree in Physical Education, having played CIS football for the McGill Redmen for 5 years. In 2009, he won an athletic excellence bursary from the Montreal Alouettes, having led the nation in tackles in 2007. With the McGill Redmen, he totals 209 tackles, 3 sacks, 7 interceptions and forced 10 fumbles in 35 games played. He is currently the Head Coach, Defensive Coordinator, Linebacker, and Longsnapper coach for Selwyn House Gryphons Juvenile (Varsity) Football Team. Anthony is also Head Coach of the Elementary school's hockey teams. He coaches Flag Football in the spring. 

On 10 June 2010, he signed with the Toronto Argonauts.  He was later released by the Argonauts on June 20, 2010.

In January, 2011, he signed with the Centaures of Grenoble, France, as Running Back and Strong Safety. 

Bio:
Played high school football at College Notre-Dame as a DB. Was named Team captain in 2002. After high school Anthony decided to go to a Prep School instead of CEGEP. He attended Choate Rosemary Hall where he played for the Wild Boars for two seasons. He was named Team Captain in his senior year (2004). 

Played college football at McGill University in Montréal, Quebec, Canada. As a McGill University Redmen he mainly played defensive back and strong side linebacker. Named McGill Redmen team captain, all conference and was invited to the Canadian East-West Bowl Game. Ranked in the top 15 CIS Draft Prospects by the CFL Amateur Scouting Bureau in November 2008, as well as being invited to the 2009 CFL Evaluation Camp.  Listed below are all of the awards received as a McGill Redmen:

-	Signed by the Toronto Argonauts in June 2010
-	Invited to the 2009 Montréal Alouettes Rookie Camp
-	Invited to the 2009 CFL Evaluation Camp in Toronto
-	Ranked in the top 15 CIS Draft Prospects by the CFL Amateur Scouting Bureau in November 2008
-	Represented McGill in the 6th Annual East-West Bowl Game in 2008
-	Named Team Captain  for the 2008 & 2009 seasons
-	McGill Best Team Player – 2009
-	McGill Most Dedicated Player- 2009
-	McGill Most Sportsmanlike Player – 2009
-	McGill Special Team Player of the Year - 2007 & 2008 
-	McGill Best Defensive Player – 2008 & 2007 
-	Selected as All-Conference (Québec) Defensive Back in 2008
-	CIS Defense, 2nd place in Canada in 2008, 73 tackles in 8 games
-	CIS Defense, 1st place in Canada in 2007, 71.5 tackle in 8 games 
-	Named MVP Defensive Player in the 2007 Montréal Shrine Bowl
-	Led the Redmen Football Team with 4 interceptions in 2006
-	McGill Most Improved Player – 2006
-	McGill Rookie of the Year (runner-up) - 2005

References

External links
 2008 McGill Redmen bio
 Lukca's Toronto Argonauts Bio
 Argonauts Press Release
 
 https://web.archive.org/web/20100619141756/http://www.ruefrontenac.com/sports/football/24213-anthony-lucka-darche-argonauts
 Centaures Website

1986 births
Living people
People from Saint-Laurent, Quebec
Players of Canadian football from Quebec
Canadian football defensive backs
Canadian football long snappers
McGill Redbirds football players
Canadian football people from Montreal